Senator Patterson may refer to:

Members of the United States Senate
David T. Patterson (1818–1891), U.S. Senator from Tennessee from 1866 to 1869
James W. Patterson (1823–1893), U.S. Senator from New Hampshire from 1867 to 1873
John J. Patterson (1830–1912), U.S. Senator from South Carolina from 1873 to 1879
Roscoe C. Patterson (1876–1954), U.S. Senator from Missouri from 1929 to 1935
Thomas M. Patterson (1839–1916), U.S. Senator from Colorado from 1901 to 1907

United States state senate members
Albert Patterson (1894–1954), Alabama State Senate
Bruce Patterson (politician) (born 1947), Michigan State Senate
Frank N. Patterson Jr. (1917–1971), North Carolina State Senate
George W. Patterson (Oregon politician) (1857–1932), Oregon State Senate
I. L. Patterson (1859–1929), Oregon State Senate
J. O. Patterson Jr. (1935–2011), Tennessee State Senate
Jerry E. Patterson (born 1946), Texas State Senate
John Patterson (Ohio congressman) (1771–1848), Ohio State Senate
Joseph M. Patterson (politician) (1837–1914), Illinois State Senate
Julia Patterson (born 1953), Washington State Senate
Kay Patterson (South Carolina politician) (born 1931), South Carolina State Senate
Liz J. Patterson (1939–2018), South Carolina State Senate
Obie Patterson (born 1938), Maryland State Senate
Paul L. Patterson (1900–1956), Oregon State Senate
Samuel F. Patterson (1799–1874), North Carolina State Senate
Samuel L. Patterson (1850–1908), North Carolina State Senate
Thomas C. Patterson (fl. 1980s–2010s), Arizona State Senate
Thomas Patterson (Arizona politician) (born 1945), Arizona State Senate

See also
Senator Paterson (disambiguation)
John M. Pattison (1847–1906), Ohio State Senate